Regina Rollinger-Jonkajtys (born 19 January 1932), better known by her stage name Rena Rolska is a Polish singer, dancer and actress.

Biography 
Regina Rollinger was born and grew up in Warsaw. She studied opera singing with professor Jadwiga Reiss. She debuted in 1955 at the Guardian Hall (now Mirów's Halls) as a dancer with the Polish Radio Dance Orchestra. Between 1956 and 1960 she performed in the cabarette Pineska.

In 1961 Rolska performed at the Sopot International Song Festival with Marek Sart's composition Piosenka prawdę ci powie (The song will tell you the truth). Rena Rolska took part in the National Festival of Polish Song in Opole in 1963 and many times after that. In the years 1971–1978 she acted at the Syrena Theatre in Warsaw.

During her career in show business (1955–1981) Rolska recorded 12 albums and performed in many countries, including the Soviet Union, the United States, Canada, Mongolia and Belgium.

She was married with Polish actor Marian Jonkajtys.

References 

1932 births
Living people
Musicians from Warsaw
Polish stage actresses
Actresses from Warsaw
20th-century Polish actresses
20th-century Polish women singers